Service to Man is a 2016 American drama film directed by Aaron Greer and Seth Panitch and starring Morgan Auld, Christopher Livingston, Lamman Rucker, and Keith David.

Cast
Keith David
Morgan Auld as Eli
Christopher Livingston as Michael
Sydney Morton
Nathan James
Tim Ross
Michael Pantozzi
George Thagard
Willie Williams
Eric Marable Jr.
Chris Bellinger
Jay Jurden
Lamman Rucker

Production
The film was shot in Tuscaloosa, Alabama.  Filming wrapped in June 2015.

Release
The film was screened at the Wichita Scottish Rite Center as part of the Tallgrass Film Festival on October 16, 2016.

Reception
Barbara Shulgasser-Parker of Common Sense Media awarded the film three stars out of five.

References

External links
 

American drama films
2016 drama films
Films shot in Alabama
2010s English-language films
2010s American films